Olivet is a city in Osage County, Kansas, United States.  As of the 2020 census, the population of the city was 73.  It is located near the south side of Melvern Lake.

History
Olivet was founded in 1869. By the end of its first year, the town contained a general store, a hotel, a sawmill, and a wagon and blacksmith shop. Olivet was incorporated as a city in 1870.

The post office in Olivet was first established in 1870, and it closed in 1971.

Geography
Olivet is located at  (38.480236, -95.751564).

Demographics

Olivet is part of the Topeka, Kansas Metropolitan Statistical Area.

2010 census
As of the census of 2010, there were 67 people, 35 households, and 23 families residing in the city. The racial makeup of the city was 89.6% White, 4.5% Asian, and 6.0% from two or more races. Hispanic or Latino of any race were 1.5% of the population.

There were 35 households, of which 22.9% had children under the age of 18 living with them, 48.6% were married couples living together, 11.4% had a female householder with no husband present, 5.7% had a male householder with no wife present, and 34.3% were non-families. 28.6% of all households were made up of individuals, and 17.2% had someone living alone who was 65 years of age or older. The average household size was 1.91 and the average family size was 2.22.

The median age in the city was 56.8 years. 13.4% of residents were under the age of 18; 6.1% were between the ages of 18 and 24; 9% were from 25 to 44; 52.2% were from 45 to 64; and 19.4% were 65 years of age or older. The gender makeup of the city was 52.2% male and 47.8% female.

2000 census
As of the census of 2000, there were 64 people, 34 households, and 16 families residing in the city. The racial makeup of the city was 98.44% White, and 1.56% from two or more races. Hispanic or Latino of any race were 1.56% of the population.

There were 34 households, out of which 11.8% had children under the age of 18 living with them, 44.1% were married couples living together, and 52.9% were non-families. 50.0% of all households were made up of individuals, and 29.4% had someone living alone who was 65 years of age or older. The average household size was 1.88 and the average family size was 2.75.

In the city, the population was spread out, with 12.5% under the age of 18, 4.7% from 18 to 24, 14.1% from 25 to 44, 46.9% from 45 to 64, and 21.9% who were 65 years of age or older. The median age was 51 years. For every 100 females, there were 88.2 males. For every 100 females age 18 and over, there were 100.0 males.

The median income for a household in the city was $32,188, and the median income for a family was $58,750. Males had a median income of $19,583 versus $17,250 for females. The per capita income for the city was $15,781. There were no families and 7.4% of the population living below the poverty line, including no under eighteens and 21.4% of those over 64.

Education
The community is served by Marais des Cygnes Valley USD 456 public school district.

References

Further reading

External links

 Olivet - Directory of Public Officials
 Olivet city map, KDOT

Cities in Kansas
Cities in Osage County, Kansas
Topeka metropolitan area, Kansas